Oxford Road is a two-way street in Kowloon Tsai (often regarded as Kowloon Tong), Kowloon City District, Hong Kong.

History
Completed in mid-1950s, Oxford Road was named after Oxford, England as one of the Kowloon Tong streets which were named after places in Britain by the British colonial authorities. Oxford, being a heritage-rich city in England, was chosen as the first name of all the Kowloon Tong streets.

Location
Oxford Road runs from Oxford Road Playground to Hereford Road near Sunderland Estate. Succeeding Flint Road at a roundabout near Ho Tung Road, Oxford Road runs northward in a divided dual-carriageway until it meets Lancashire Road near Lannox Gardens. Crossing the junction, Oxford Road merges into a two-way street which continues to run northbound. It meets Moray Road, Selkirk Road and Hampshire Road respectively on the west side and then intersects with Durham Road near Kowloon Tsai House tennis court. After Durham Road, Oxford Road meets Wiltshire Road on the west and finally terminates at Hereford Road near Sunderland Estate and Mary Rose School.

Features
Oxford Road is home to many schools such as, beginning from Oxford Road Playground, Maryknoll Convent School, Caritas Francis Hsu College, Creative Primary School, TWGHs Wong Fut Nam College, Jockey Club Government Secondary School, Kei Wa Primary School (Kowloon Tong) and Bishop Hall Jubilee School, together with, formerly, Ying Wa College and Pui Shing Middle School (Renamed Pui Shing Catholic Secondary School in 1992).

See also
 List of streets and roads in Hong Kong

References

Kowloon Tsai
Kowloon City District
Roads in New Kowloon